Olearia flocktoniae, commonly known as Dorrigo daisy bush, is a species of flowering plant in the family Asteraceae and is endemic to a restricted area of New South Wales. It is a shrub with crowded, linear leaves, and white and yellow, daisy-like inflorescences.

Description
The edges of the leaves are rolled under and both surfaces are covered with soft hairs. Each head has 30 to 48 white ray florets, often tinged with violet, surrounding 39 to 49 yellow disc florets. Flowering occurs in February and March and the fruit is a silky-hairy achene, the pappus with 36 to 47 bristles.

Taxonomy
Olearia flocktoniae was first formally described in 1909 by Joseph Maiden and Ernst Betche from specimens collected by John Luke Boorman from near Dorrigo in the same year. The specific epithet (flocktoniae) honours Margaret Flockton.

Distribution and habitat
Dorrigo daisy bush grows in disturbed sites in wet forest and rainforest on the northern edge of the Dorrigo Plateau in northern New South Wales.

Conservation status
Olearia flocktoniae is listed as "endangered" under the Australian Government Environment Protection and Biodiversity Conservation Act 1999 and the New South Wales Government Biodiversity Conservation Act 2016. The main threats to the species include habitat change, vehicle damage, and road maintenance.

References

flocktoniae
Asterales of Australia
Flora of New South Wales
Plants described in 1909
Taxa named by Joseph Maiden